The following lists events that happened during 2008 in Cambodia.

Incumbents 
 Monarch: Norodom Sihamoni 
 Prime Minister: Hun Sen

Events

January
 January 16 - At the first Mekong-Japan foreign ministers meeting in Tokyo, Japan pledges US$20 million in aid for development projects in Cambodia, Laos and Vietnam. Left out of the aid picture was Burma, a former recipient of Japanese aid, whose foreign minister Nyan Win was present for the meeting.
 January 25 - Chinese foreign minister Yang Jiechi will visit Brunei, Cambodia and Australia on official visits from January 31 to February 5, the Foreign Ministry says.
 January 25 - A rear tire bursts on the landing gear of a Thai Airways International flight from Bangkok as it lands at Phnom Penh International Airport. There are no injuries among the 160 passengers and crew.
 January 26 - Thai officials say they will not oppose Cambodia's seeking World Heritage Site status for Prasat Preah Vihear, refuting a Thai Defense Ministry spokesman's earlier statements that the listing should not be granted without Thai participation.
 January 30 -  FBI director Robert Mueller visits Vietnam and Cambodia on a mission to expand legal cooperation. In Phnom Penh, he is to open a new FBI office.

February
 February 4 - Former Khmer Rouge No. 2 leader Nuon Chea briefly appears before the Extraordinary Chambers in the Courts of Cambodia, asking for postponement of his appeal because of a dispute regarding his Dutch attorney and the Cambodian Bar Association.
 February 5 - US$2.808 billion was invested in Cambodia in 2007, according to the Cambodian Chamber of Commerce.

October
 October 16 - Cambodia and Thailand agree to joint border controls following a recent clash.
 October 19 - Cambodia agrees to release 13 Royal Thai Army soldiers captured during recent fighting in the 2008 Cambodian-Thai stand-off.

See also
List of Cambodian films of 2008

References

 
Years of the 21st century in Cambodia
Cambodia
2000s in Cambodia
Cambodia